Christian Nationalist Party or Christian National Party may refer to:

 Christian Nationalist Party, English translation of Parti nationaliste chrétien, Quebec, Canada, 1960s
 Christian Nationalist Party, the political wing of the Christian Nationalist Crusade, U.S., 1940s–50s
 Philippine Christian Nationalist Party, a political party in the Philippines
Christian National Party (Colombia), current
Christian National Party (Hungary), 1920s
Constitution Party (United States, 1952), or Christian Nationalist Party, a far-right-wing party that drafted Douglas MacArthur as presidential candidate

See also

Christian National Opposition Party, Hungary, 1920s
Christian National Union Party, Hungary, 1920s
Christian National Union, Poland, 1989–2010
Christian National Union (Latvia), 1920s–1930s
Christian-National Peasants' and Farmers' Party, Weimar Germany 1920s–1930s
Christian Democratic National Peasants' Party, Romania, founded 1989
National Christian Party, Romania, 1935–1938
National Democratic Christian Party, Romania, 1990–2014